Cuauhtémoc is one of the 58 municipalities in the Mexican state of Zacatecas. It is located in the central part of the state of Zacatecas and it is bounded by the municipalities of Ojocaliente, Luis Moya, and Genaro Codina; it also shares a border with the state of Aguascalientes.

References

Municipalities of Zacatecas